Carlos Alberti (born 26 August 1959) is a retired Vancouver Columbus FC player and coach.

Life
Alberti was part of the team representing Canada at the 1978 CONCACAF U-20 Tournament, he earned a silver medal there. He also participated  with the Canadian National Youth Team in the FIFA Under 20 World Cup of Soccer in Japan in 1979. He played for the Houston Hurricanes of the NASL.

He currently coaches for Ultimate Soccer School. He is of Italian ancestry.

References

1959 births
Living people
Canada men's youth international soccer players
Vancouver Columbus players
Canadian soccer players
Houston Hurricane players
North American Soccer League (1968–1984) players
Canadian sportspeople of Italian descent
Association football defenders